The South Africa national cricket team toured Bangladesh for two Test matches and three One Day Internationals in February and March 2008. For South Africa, it represented the first tour after the retirement of bowler Shaun Pollock while Bangladesh were looking to rebuild after heavy defeats against New Zealand and Sri Lanka.

The naming of South Africa's squad was delayed for over a week after a selection row. The squad presented to Cricket South Africa (CSA) chiefs did not contain the expected number of black players (six) although this squad was eventually ratified and named to travel. There was a late change when Robin Peterson replaced Paul Harris who had to undergo surgery for an abscess.

Bangladesh recalled veteran left-arm spinner Mohammad Rafique to their Test squad, his first inclusion since July 2007.

Squads

Matches

Test series

1st Test

2nd Test

ODI series

1st ODI

2nd ODI

3rd ODI

Tour matches

Bangladesh Cricket Board XI v South Africans

Bangladesh Cricket Board XI v South Africans

References

2008 in Bangladeshi cricket
2008 in South African cricket
Bangladeshi cricket seasons from 2000–01
International cricket competitions in 2007–08
2007-08